Al Bayda'  is an airstrip serving the town of Al Bayda' in Yemen.

See also
Transport in Yemen

References

External links
 OurAirports - Yemen
 Great Circle Mapper - Al Bayda'
 Al Bayda'

Airports in Yemen